
Year 381 (CCCLXXXI) was a common year starting on Friday (link will display the full calendar) of the Julian calendar. At the time, it was known as the Year of the Consulship of Syagrius and Eucherius (or, less frequently, year 1134 Ab urbe condita). The denomination 381 for this year has been used since the early medieval period, when the Anno Domini calendar era became the prevalent method in Europe for naming years.

Events 
 By place 
 Roman Empire 
 Emperor Gratian moves the capital to Mediolanum (modern-day Milan). Because of his Christian beliefs, he eliminates Pontifex Maximus as Imperial title. Gratian also refuses the robe of office, insulting the pagan aristocrats of Rome.
 The Gallic city of Cularo is renamed Gratianopolis (later Grenoble), in honor of Gratian having created a bishopric.

 Europe 
 The Visigothic chieftain Athanaric becomes the first foreign king to visit the Eastern Roman capital of Constantinople. He negotiates a peace treaty with emperor Theodosius I that makes his people foederati in a state within a state. Athanaric dies 2 weeks later after an 18-year reign in which he has been undisputed king of all the Goths for just 1 year. The peace will continue until Theodosius's death in 395.
 The Sciri ally themselves with the Huns.

 By topic 
 Religion 
 First Council of Constantinople (some authorities date this council to 383): Theodosius I calls a general council to affirm and extend the Nicene creed, and denounce Arianism and Apollinarism.  Most trinitarian churches consider this an Ecumenical council.
 Council of Aquileia: Ambrose and the council depose the Arian bishops Palladius of Ratiaria and Secundianus of Singidunum.
 Flavian succeeds Meletius as Patriarch of Antioch.
 Timothy succeeds Peter II as Patriarch of Alexandria.
 Nectarius succeeds Gregory Nazianzus as Archbishop of Constantinople.
 John Chrysostom becomes a deacon.

Births 
 Helian Bobo, Chinese emperor of the Xiongnu state Xia (d. 425)

Deaths 

 February 15 – Faustinus of Brescia, Roman Catholic bishop and saint
 February 27 – Peter II, Patriarch of Alexandria
 June 29 – Saint Syrus, Bishop of Genoa

Date unknown 
 Athanaric, king of the Visigoths
 Saint Meletius, Patriarch of Antioch

References